Universal Religion Chapter 5 is the fifth compilation album in the Universal Religion compilation series, mixed and compiled by Dutch DJ and record producer Armin van Buuren. It was released on 29 September 2011 by Armada Music.

Track listing

References

External links
Universal Religion Chapter 5 at Discogs

Armin van Buuren compilation albums
Electronic compilation albums
2011 compilation albums